is a monthly Japanese  manga magazine published by Akita Shoten. It launched in December 1974 and is released on the sixth of each month. It has inspired several spin-off publications, including Bessatsu Viva Princess, renamed Viva Princess (1976–1990), Princess Gold (1979–2020); Bessatsu Princess (1990–1994); and Princess Golds own spin-off, Petit Princess, launched in 2002 and published on the first of each month.

Serializations

Current
 Crest of the Royal Family by Chieko Hosokawa (since 1976)
 Hiiro no Uta by Maki Fujita (since 2020)
 His Majesty the Demon King's Housekeeper (since 2019)
 King of Idol: Bara-Ō no Gakuen by Kineko Abekawa (since 2021)
 Toki o Kakeru Sukeban Deka by Saori Muronaga (since 2021)
 Re: Sukeban Deka by Ashibi Fukui (since 2021)
 Sukeban Deka Pretend by Sai Ihara and Shingi Hosokawa (since 2021)
 Hōkago Pedal High Cadence by Kineko Abekawa, ikra, Yukiko Tonō and Wataru Midori (since 2023)

Former
 Bride of Deimos by Etsuko Ikeda and Yuuho Ashibe (1974–1990)
 Angélique by Toshie Kihara (1977–1979)
 Olympus no Pollon by Hideo Azuma (1977–1979)
 From Eroica with Love by Yasuko Aoike (1979–2007)
 A, A Prime by Moto Hagio (one-shot; 1981)
 A.I. Revolution by Yuu Asami (1994–2003)
 Lady Victorian by Naoko Moto (1998–2007)
 Her Majesty's Dog by Mick Takeuchi (2000–2002)
 X-Day by Setona Mizushiro (2002)
 Crossroad by Shioko Mizuki (2002–2005)
 Tenshi Ja Nai!! by Takako Shigematsu (2003–2006)
 The Knockout Makers by Kyoko Hashimoto (2003–2005)
 After School Nightmare by Setona Mizushiro (2004–2007)
 Shinobi Life by Shoko Conami (2006–2012)
 Black Rose Alice by Setona Mizushiro (2008–2011)
 Shikabane Cherry by Shoko Conami (2012–2016)
 Requiem of the Rose King by Aya Kanno (2013–2022)
 Beasts of Abigaile by Spica Aoki (2015–2018)
 Rosen Blood by Kachiru Ishizue (2017–2022)
 Yakusoku wa Toshokan no Katasumi de by Maki Fujita (2019–2020)

Notes

References

External links
  
 Official Twitter account 
 

1974 establishments in Japan
Akita Shoten magazines
Magazines established in 1974
Magazines published in Tokyo
Monthly manga magazines published in Japan
Shōjo manga magazines